The 13th Iowa Infantry Regiment was an infantry regiment that served in the Union Army during the American Civil War.

Service
The 13th Iowa Infantry was organized at Davenport, Iowa, and mustered in for three years of Federal service  between October 18 and November 2, 1861.  Its troops came primarily from the Iowa counties of Linn, Jasper, Marion, Lucas, Keokuk, Scott, Polk, Benton, Marshall and Washington.

The regiment was mustered out on July 21, 1865.

Iowa Brigade
After the battle of Shiloh, the Thirteenth Iowa was assigned to the Third Brigade of the Sixth Division. The Brigade was composed of the Eleventh, Thirteenth, Fifteenth and Sixteenth regiments of Iowa Infantry, and was under command of Colonel Crocker. This organization remained intact until the close of the war. Except when upon detached duty, the operations of each of the regiments were identified very largely with those of the brigade, and, therefore, the history of each of these four Iowa regiments is almost inseparably interwoven with that of the brigade.

Capture of Columbia

Total strength and casualties
The 13th Iowa mustered 1788 men at one time or another during its existence.
It suffered 5 officers and 114 enlisted men who were killed in action or who died of their wounds and 4 officers and 205 enlisted men who died of disease, for a total of 328 fatalities.

Commanders
 Colonel Marcellus M. Crocker
 Colonel John Shane
 Colonel James Wilson
 Colonel Justin C. Kennedy

See also
List of Iowa Civil War Units
Iowa in the American Civil War

Notes

References
The Civil War Archive

Units and formations of the Union Army from Iowa
1861 establishments in Iowa
Military units and formations established in 1861
Military units and formations disestablished in 1865